Damian "Tico" Rivera (born December 8, 2002) is an American soccer player who plays as a midfielder for New England Revolution II as a member of the New England Revolution.

Career

New England Revolution
In November 2019, Rivera signed a homegrown contract with the Revolution. He made his professional debut with New England's USL League One affiliate on August 7, 2020 against Orlando City B. In October of that season, Rivera scored his first professional goal, netting in the 83rd minute of a 4-0 victory over the Richmond Kickers. He would finish his inaugural season with the club with two goals and an assist in 14 league appearances.

On April 30, 2022, Rivera made his first MLS start, and subsequently scored his first MLS goal, in the Revolution's 2-0 win over Inter Miami CF. In the process he became only the third player in league history to score in the first minute of his first MLS start, and the first to do so since Real Salt Lake's Matias Mantilla on Aug. 29, 2007.

International career
Born in the United States, Rivera is of Costa Rican and Guatemalan descent. He is a youth international for the United States, having represented the United States U17s.

Career statistics

Club

Honours
New England Revolution
 Supporters' Shield: 2021

References

External links
Damian Rivera at New England Revolution
Damian Rivera at US Soccer Development Academy

2002 births
Living people
American soccer players
United States men's youth international soccer players
American people of Costa Rican descent
American people of Guatemalan descent
New England Revolution players
New England Revolution II players
USL League One players
Association football midfielders
Sportspeople from Cranston, Rhode Island
Soccer players from Rhode Island
Homegrown Players (MLS)
Major League Soccer players
MLS Next Pro players